Hypatopa is a genus of moths in the family Blastobasidae.

Species

Hypatopa actes
Hypatopa acus
Hypatopa agnae
Hypatopa annulipes
Hypatopa arxcis
Hypatopa bilobata
Hypatopa binotella
Hypatopa boreasella
Hypatopa brevipalpella (Walsingham, 1897)
Hypatopa caedis
Hypatopa caepae
Hypatopa cladis
Hypatopa cotis
Hypatopa cotytto
Hypatopa crescentella
Hypatopa crux
Hypatopa cryptopalpella Adamski, 1999
Hypatopa cyane
Hypatopa dicax
Hypatopa dolo
Hypatopa dux
Hypatopa edax
Hypatopa eos
Hypatopa erato
Hypatopa fio
Hypatopa fluxella
Hypatopa funebra
Hypatopa gena
Hypatopa hecate
Hypatopa hera
Hypatopa hora
Hypatopa hulstella
Hypatopa ibericella
Hypatopa illibella
Hypatopa inconspicua
Hypatopa insulatella
Hypatopa interpunctella
Hypatopa inunctella
Hypatopa io
Hypatopa ira
Hypatopa joniella
Hypatopa juno
Hypatopa leda Adamski, 2013
Hypatopa limae
Hypatopa lucina
Hypatopa manus
Hypatopa messelinella
Hypatopa montivaga (Inoue et al., 1982)
Hypatopa mora
Hypatopa moriutiella Sinev, 1986
Hypatopa morrisoni
Hypatopa musa
Hypatopa nex
Hypatopa nigrostriata
Hypatopa nox
Hypatopa nucella
Hypatopa phoebe
Hypatopa pica
Hypatopa plebis
Hypatopa punctiferella
Hypatopa rabio
Hypatopa rea
Hypatopa rego
Hypatopa rudis
Hypatopa sagitella
Hypatopa sais
Hypatopa scobis
Hypatopa segnella
Hypatopa semela
Hypatopa silvestrella Kuznetzov, 1984
Hypatopa simplicella
Hypatopa solea
Hypatopa spoliatella (Dietz, 1910)
Hypatopa spretella
Hypatopa styga
Hypatopa tapadulcea
Hypatopa texanella
Hypatopa texla
Hypatopa texo
Hypatopa tianschanica Sinev, 1993
Hypatopa titanella
Hypatopa umbra
Hypatopa ursella
Hypatopa verax
Hypatopa vestaliella
Hypatopa vitis
Hypatopa vox

References

 
Blastobasidae genera
Taxa named by Thomas de Grey, 6th Baron Walsingham